Malayattoor is a town in the Ernakulam district of Kerala, India

Malayattoor may also refer to:

Malayattoor Ramakrishnan, a novelist from Kerala, India
Malayattoor Saint Thomas Church, in Kerala, India